Piotr Olszewski (born 25 April 1973) is a Polish rower. He competed in the men's coxless four event at the 1996 Summer Olympics.

References

1973 births
Living people
Polish male rowers
Olympic rowers of Poland
Rowers at the 1996 Summer Olympics
Rowers from Warsaw